iDon (also stylized as iDON and idon) is the third studio album by Puerto Rican reggaeton performer Don Omar released worldwide on April 28, 2009, through Universal Music Group and Machete Music. The album was assumed to be named Icon when news of the upcoming album circulated the internet, but was later confirmed to be named iDon in November 2008.

Reception 
The album received a nomination for the Billboard Latin Music Award for Latin Rhythm Album of the Year in 2010. Also the album was received nomination for the Latin Grammy Awards for Best Urban Music Album in 2009.

And sold 200,000 copies in the Middle East, and in the US sold 100,000 copies estimated, and the album sold most over 4 million digital download and movile, including sales singles. Don Omar was cover in the magazine Billboard by sales digital in the history and was of the best covers Latin of Billboard. The album was recognized as the album of the future by Billboard, Don Omar i collaborate the platform ITunes for download music on movile was the firt artist Latin on made it.

Don Omar made conference Billboard Latin Music Awards for album IDon, also made one performance Billboard Latin Music Awards on 2009.

Background

Conception
The concept of the album was revealed when Universal Music Group described the music on the album as "an evolution of Don Omar's music fusing electronic, dance, hip-hop and reggaeton sounds as the musical landscape for the Latin music superstar's revolutionary lyrics." The label also stated that the album "will be supported by visual and marketing campaign elements focused on positioning Don Omar as the defining artist for the digital age and the leader of the music world's next generation." The record label also described iDon to be "one of the most anticipated albums in the history of Latin music." As stated above, the album is expected to have an overall electro-dance vibe with an urban touch to it.

Production
The album is mainly produced by long-time working reggaeton producer Diesel, who also produced one of Don Omar's well known singles, "Salió El Sol." The album will also include addition production from Danny Fornaris, Echo and Effect-O. It was originally believed to also include album collaborations with Marcy Place, a bachata group founded by Don Omar. It was later confirmed that they would not be performing with Don Omar on his third studio album.

Promotion

Singles

 The lead single, "Virtual Diva", was released through nationwide airplay in December 2008, and has since become the most requested song at urban radio, reaching the number-one position on the Billboard Latin Rhythm Airplay chart. It was then released on both digital and mobile formats on February 3, 2009, in the United States. The song was written and produced by Don Omar and Diesel, and has a more upbeat electro-urban mix in the sound, which was considered something new for Don Omar. It was the most successful single from the album at the time of its release, peaking at number 10 on the Billboard Hot Latin Tracks chart. A music video for "Virtual Diva" was produced and filmed in Buenos Aires, Argentina. It was announced around the end of January 2009 after a performance with Marcy Place at the Providence Club in New York City that he would be traveling by the end of the week to Argentina to begin filming. The video was finished with production on February 13, 2009, when it was announced that Don Omar had already concluded with filming. The video will feature Argentinean model Ingrid Grudke, who portrays a doctor who wants to perform a grand experiment transforming Don Omar into half-man, half-machine. The song was also performed live for the first time on the MTV Tr3́s variety series Entertainment as a Second Language on February 26, 2009.
 "Sexy Robotica" is the official second single from the album on June 5, 2009. A music video for "Sexy Robotica" was released on July 10, 2009.
 "Ciao Bella" is the official third single from iDon, it was released on August 18, 2009. A salsa version was released to promote the single.

Other notable songs
 Although "Blue Zone" was not released officially as a single, it charted at number #5 on the Record Report Latin chart from Venezuela, and was considered a successful single.

Tour
Don Omar is expected to be touring in 2010, in promotion of his re-edition third studio album iDon. As confirmed on his MySpace profile, dates and locations of his concert tour have yet to be released, and are likely to be released on the day of the album's re-release.

Track listing
Standard edition

Bonus Tracks

Chart performance

Sales and certifications

Credits
Philip Chiore - engineer, mixing
Kiley Del'Valle - design
Mateo Garcia - photography
Nanette Lamboy - public relations
William Omar Landron - executive producer
Adam Torres - management

References

External links
 iDon.com

2009 albums
Concept albums
Don Omar albums
Machete Music albums